A splash dam was a temporary wooden dam used to raise the water level in streams to float logs downstream to sawmills. By impounding water and allowing it to be released on the log drive's schedule, these dams allowed many more logs to be brought to market than the natural flow of the creek allowed. Water releases from multiple splash dams on tributaries were also often combined to maximize the number of logs floated throughout a given watershed.

Construction
Splash dams were typically constructed of logs or boards, which formed cribs that were then filled with stones and earth. A splash dam had to be sited on a section of the stream that allowed as large a body of water to accumulate behind the dam as possible. Behind the dam logs were transported to the creek and its banks, often along log slides.

The splash dam was equipped with a chute to allow water and logs to escape. When the chute was closed, water collected behind the dam. Construction work also extended to the stream below the splash dam, which had to be cleared of obstacles and often had its banks cleared for some distance above the waterline. This was an effort to prevent as many logs as possible from becoming stuck on the banks of the creek. The Pennsylvania General Assembly passed a law on March 28, 1871 allowing splash dam construction and clearing of creeks to allow loose logs to float better.

Use

Originally lumber was only floated downstream using seasonal high water, typically in spring following snowmelt. Loggers found that by constructing a dam to impound water they could control the level of water and float more logs, which improved conditions for log drivers. In addition to the annual early spring log drive in March, splash dams frequently allowed smaller drives anytime there was sufficient water: in Pennsylvania rains could lead to drives in May or June, and small drives in September or October were also possible.

To give some idea of the scale of the log drives, Pennsylvania's Pine Creek, the largest tributary of the West Branch Susquehanna River, had produced rafts of pine spars for decades, ending in 1865. In 1908, a single splash dam in northcentral Pennsylvania floated  in one log drive.

Log drives lasted four to six days in northern Pennsylvania. A series of arks, boats specially built for the drive, floated down the creek behind the logs. Typically one boat was the kitchen and dining area, one served as sleeping quarters for the men, and one provided shelter for the horses. The men and horses worked in the creek all day getting logs stranded on the banks back in the water. Log jams were a problem as well and required careful removal of one or more key logs to break the jam and allow the logs to again flow freely.  Breaking a logjam might involve one or more men working with hand tools, or it might involve explosives.

By impounding water and allowing it to be released on the log drive's schedule, these dams allowed many more logs to be brought to market than the natural flow of the creek allowed. Water releases from multiple splash dams on tributaries were also often combined to maximize the number of logs floated throughout a given watershed.

Legacy

Splash dams operated across the United States, from about 1860 to 1930. As of 2008, the United States Geological Survey Geographic Names Information System shows thirteen place names in the United States containing the words "splash dam". Pennsylvania has the most, with eight places, but there are also places in Kentucky, Virginia, Utah, and Idaho named "Splash Dam". Two Pennsylvania state parks, Parker Dam State Park and McCalls Dam State Park, are named for splash dams.

References

Dams by type
Timber rafting